Vărbilău is a commune in Prahova County, Muntenia, Romania. It is composed of five villages: Coțofenești, Livadea, Podu Ursului, Poiana Vărbilău, and Vărbilău.

Geography 
It lies on the banks of the Vărbilău River, in a hilly area at the foot of the Ciucaș Mountains.

History 

A gold ceremonial helm (5th century BC) was discovered at Poiana Coțofenești in 1929. Additional research was done by archaeologist , immediately after the finding. The helmet is kept at the National History Museum of Romania.

People 
Gabi Luncă (1938–2021), Romanian-Romani lăutar musician
Ely Culbertson (1891–1955), American contract bridge entrepreneur and personality

References

Further reading 

 http://www.cimec.ro/Arheologie/Arhiva-Digitala/5Situri/PoianaCotofenesti/PoianaCotofenesti.htm
 http://art-historia.blogspot.com/2010/10/sergiu-decebal-si-coiful-de-aur.html
 http://www2.rgzm.de/Transformation/Romania/Mining/Image01engl.htm

External links 
 Poiana-Coţofeneşti in the Digital Archaeological Archive at cIMeC 
 Helmet reconstruction 
 Helmet image

Communes in Prahova County
Localities in Muntenia